Kentucky Route 1008 (KY 1008) is a secondary state highway located entirely in Simpson County in south-central Kentucky. It is basically a beltway around the county seat of Franklin as it goes almost completely around the city.

Intersections

See also

References

External links
Kentucky Transportation Cabinet

Beltways in the United States
1008
1008